Bykovo is a rural locality (a village) in Pokrovskoye Rural Settlement, Velikoustyugsky District, Vologda Oblast, Russia. The population was 12 as of 2002.

Geography 
Bykovo is located 52 km southeast of Veliky Ustyug (the district's administrative centre) by road. Martishchevo is the nearest rural locality.

References 

Rural localities in Velikoustyugsky District